Hoseynabad-e Akhund (also Romanized as Ḩoseynābād-e Akhūnd; also known as Ḩoseynābād, Ḩoseynābād-e Khān, and Husainābād) is a village in Sar Asiab-e Farsangi Rural District, in the Central District of Kerman County, Kerman Province, Iran. At the 2006 census, its population was 55, in 16 families.

References 

Populated places in Kerman County